Přepeře may refer to:

 Přepeře (Mladá Boleslav District)
Přepeře (Semily District)